The Space National Guard is the proposed National Guard component of the United States Space Force.

Cost
A report by the Congressional Budget Office indicated that the creation of a Space National Guard, as proposed by the National Guard Bureau, would cost an additional $100 million per year in operations and support costs, with a onetime cost of $20 million in the construction of new facilities. This report directly contradicted the statement by the National Guard Bureau that a Space National Guard would only have a onetime cost at creation, and then be cost-neutral.

The report also analyzed the cost of the creation of a larger Space National Guard, which would be ~33% of the Space Force, calculating that the annual operating cost would be $385 million to $490 million per year.

Proposal history

Pre-2019
In September 2018, Air Force Major General Donald P. Dunbar, the Adjutant General of Wisconsin, penned an editorial for the Air Force Times in which he wrote that "it seems logical that the nation would see the Guard as an asset in a new Space Force". Members of the United States Congress, including Senators Joe Manchin and Jack Reed, also expressed concern the Department of Defense's proposal did not include the creation of a Space National Guard component. The following month, Director of the Air National Guard Gen L. Scott Rice stated that the Defense Department was committed to having both space reserve and National Guard components.

In June 2019, Congressman Jason Crow of Colorado introduced an amendment to the National Defense Authorization Act for the fiscal year 2020, which stipulated that the "Secretary of Defense may not transfer any personnel or resources from any reserve components, including the National Guard, to the Space Force ... until the date on which a Space National Guard of the United States has been established by law," however, the language was not included in the final National Defense Authorization Act.

On August 31, 2019, the chief of the National Guard Bureau, Air Force General Joseph Lengyel stated that a Space National Guard should be established. Two days later Air Force Brigadier General Patrick Cobb, special assistant to the National Guard Chief for space, confirmed that a proposed Space National Guard would absorb both Air National Guard and Army National Guard units performing space missions.

2019–present

The Senate Armed Services Committee voted to approve its markup of the National Defense Authorization Act for fiscal 2022. Included in the markup, which will now advance to the full Senate, is a name change for the Air National Guard, making it the Air and Space National Guard. Such a move would likely mean there would be no separate Space Guard established. 

The final version of the National Defense Authorization Act did not include any provision for a Space National Guard or federal Space Force reserve component. The Space Force is evaluating a number of different options for reserve components, including a new single component service with both full time and part time members or removing traditional reserve components, like the National Guard all together. A report on Space Force reserve structure is due to the United States Congress on 19 March 2020. The inclusion of a Space National Guard, as opposed to just a Space Force reserve, has been quite controversial, as there is only a federal mission in space, without any state missions, and a concern that individual states will lobby for their own Space National Guard units, dramatically increasing bureaucratic overhead for the sake of benefiting their local economies.

A number of National Guard generals, including Army Major General David Baldwin, Adjutant General of California, and Air Force Major General Michael A. Loh, then the Adjutant General of Colorado, have expressed concern that the Defense Department will not endorse a Space National Guard and have opted to ignore the Office of the Secretary of Defense and instead have directly lobbied Congress for a Space National Guard. Maj. Gen. Baldwin stated: "When they’re going to act and whether they allow [Office of the Secretary of Defense] to go through their process to come to the conclusion on their own that we need a Space National Guard, or we leverage Congress and have Congress just put it in the NDAA and make it happen remains to be seen."

Organization

States with existing National Guard space operations are Alaska, California, Colorado, Florida, New York, Arkansas, and Ohio.

See also
 United States Space Command

References

External links
https://retireenews.org/2020/01/14/hawaii-air-national-guard-to-create-space-control-squadron/ Hawaii Air National Guard to form one of four Guard offensive space control squadrons (2020)
https://www.airforcemag.com/sasc-releases-ndaa-markup-with-25-billion-extra-new-name-for-air-national-guard (Jun 23, 2021)
https://www.airforcemag.com/senators-endorse-space-force-reserve-but-question-guard (June 11, 2020)

National Guard (United States)
Space warfare